The Douglass House is a historic house currently located at the corner of Front and Montgomery Streets in the Mill Hill neighborhood of the city Trenton in Mercer County, New Jersey. It served as George Washington's headquarters prior to the Battle of Princeton on January 3, 1777. Listed as the Bright–Douglass House, it was documented by the Historic American Buildings Survey in 1936, when the house was located in Mahlon Stacy Park near the Delaware River. It was added to the National Register of Historic Places on December 18, 1970, for its significance in architecture, military and social history. It was added as a contributing property to the Mill Hill Historic District on December 12, 1977.

History and description
It was built by Jacob Bright, who sold it to Alexander Douglass, a quartermaster in the Continental Army, in 1769. As of 2017, the house was undergoing extensive renovation.

See also
List of Washington's Headquarters during the Revolutionary War
List of the oldest buildings in New Jersey
National Register of Historic Places listings in Mercer County, New Jersey

References

External links

 

Houses on the National Register of Historic Places in New Jersey
Federal architecture in New Jersey
Houses completed in 1766
Houses in Trenton, New Jersey
National Register of Historic Places in Trenton, New Jersey
Individually listed contributing properties to historic districts on the National Register in New Jersey
Historic American Buildings Survey in New Jersey
New Jersey Register of Historic Places